Fencing at the 2001 Southeast Asian Games was held in  JKR headquarters, Kuala Lumpur, Malaysia from 10 to 12 September 2001  Only individual event was held.

Medalists

Medal table
Legend

References

External links
 

2001
Southeast Asian Games
2001 Southeast Asian Games events